Reisinger is a surname. Notable people with the surname include:
Andreas Reisinger (born 1963), Austrian footballer
Dan Reisinger (1934–2019), Israeli designer
Eduard Reisinger (born 1957), Austrian canoeist
J. Monroe Reisinger (1842–1925), American soldier
Julius Reisinger (1828–1892), Russian Ballet choreographer
Stefan Reisinger (born 1981), German footballer
Wilhelm Reisinger (born 1958), German footballer
Wolfgang Reisinger (1955–2022), Austrian jazz musician